Steven Moss (born ) is an American author and educator known for co-writing We Could Not Fail, a book covering the lives of the first ten black Americans who worked for NASA.

Early life and education
Moss was educated at Texas Tech University, where he wrote his master's thesis on race issues concerning NASA.

Career
Moss is an associate professor of English at Texas State Technical College.

Moss collaborated with Richard Paul, a radio producer who was working to document the lives of early black NASA employees, to write a book covering the lives of the first ten black engineers and scientists who had worked at NASA.

References

American non-fiction writers
Living people
1960s births